A forest preserve is a type of nature reserve.

Forest Preserve may also refer to:

 Forest Preserve (New York), land owned by the state within the Adirondack and Catskill parks
 Forest Preserve District of Cook County, a governmental commission in Illinois
 Forest Preserve District of DuPage County, a governmental agency headquartered in Wheaton, Illinois
 Forest Preserve District of Will County, Illinois
 Forest Preserves of Cook County, Illinois

See also 
 Forest Glen Preserve, Vermilion County, Illinois
 Forest reserve (disambiguation)